Eleutherius, Eleutherus or Eleuterus may refer to:

Gods 
An epithet of Dionysus and Zeus, meaning 'The Liberator'

Saints 
2nd century Pope Eleutherius (feast day: May 26)
Eleutherius of Rocca d'Arce (feast day: May 29), English pilgrim who died at Rocca d'Arce 
Eleutherius of Nicomedia (feast day: October 2), a soldier who was martyred under Diocletian
Eleutherius of Tournai (died 532), bishop of Tournai, 5th century evangelist of the Franks
Eleutherius and Antia (feast day: died 121), martyrs
the martyred companion of Saint Denis of Paris (martyred c.250, feast day: October 9)

Bishops 
Eleutherius, Bishop of the west Saxons

Patriarchs and exarchs 
Eleutherius of Byzantium, Patriarch of Constantinople (129–136)
Eleutherius, Greek Patriarch of Antioch (1023–1028)
Eleutherius, Greek Patriarch of Alexandria (1175–1180) 
Eleutherius (exarch) (died 620), 7th century Exarch of Ravenna

See also
Eleutherius Winance (1909–2009), Belgian-born Benedictine monk and philosophy professor
Saint Eleutherius (disambiguation)
Eleutherios (disambiguation)
Eleuter, Polish poet, essayist, dramatist and writer
Luther (disambiguation)